Dona Aurelia Correia (d. circa 1875), also known as Mae Aurelia, Mame Correia Aurelia and Madame Oralia, was a Euro-African nhara slave trader.  

She was a dominant key figure in the business life of Guinea-Bissau during the first half of the 19th-century. She is regarded as the most famous of the nhara-community of the region, was regarded as an important member of the community by the Portuguese and described as a powerful businesswoman in oral African tradition. 

She was the fosterchild and possibly maternal niece of Julia da Silva Cardoso, and the de facto wife of the businessman Caetano José Nozolini (1800-1850), Portuguese governor of Cape Verde.  She was the co-manager of the mutli business company Nozolini Jr. & Co..  She was initially a slave trader, and gradually shifted to growing peanuts with slave labour when the West African slave trade started to shrink in the 1830s.  She exported peanuts to France via Gorée, introduced peanut cultivation in many parts of Guinea and became the likely biggest peanut-planter in Guinea.  Her use of slave labour did cause conflicts between her and the British West Africa Squadron, who raded her plantations on Bolama in 1839, and Freetown, who drove her off Bolama in 1860; in the 1850s, she owned a third of all slaves in Guinea.  She also acted as a diplomat and mediator between the Portuguese and the indigenous population, as well as between the Portuguese and the British, and as such played an important political role in the region.

References

19th-century births
19th-century deaths
19th-century businesswomen
19th-century African businesspeople
African slave traders
Plantation owners
19th-century women landowners
Women slave owners